Iceland was represented at the Eurovision Song Contest 1994 by Sigga with the song "Nætur".

Before Eurovision

Söngvakeppni Sjónvarpsins 1994 
The Icelandic broadcaster opted to change the format of the final compared to the previous years, due to the cost of a ten-song final being considered extremely high and being able to put in more effort in the final version of the song. The final was held on 23 February 1994 at the RÚV studios in Reykjavík, hosted by Hermann Gunnarsson. 3 songs competed, with the winner being selected by an "expert" jury, consisting of: Hermanns Gunnarssonar, Á tali and Hemma Gunn. Only the winner was announced. The winner was "Nætur" performed by Sigrún Eva Ármannsdóttir. 

Key:  Winner

Artist replacement 
After the national final, officials at RÚV believed that the original arrangement would not fair well at the contest and gave the task of rearranging the song to Frank McNamara, who also chose a new singer, which turned out to be Sigga. Sigga had already represented the country 2 times by that point, in 1990 (as part of Stjórnin) and 1992 (as member of Heart 2 Heart).

At Eurovision 
Sigga performed 5th on the night of the contest, held in Dublin, Ireland, following Cyprus and preceding the United Kingdom. She received 49 points for her performance of "Nætur", placing 12th of 25 competing countries. The Icelandic jury awarded its 12 points to contest winners Ireland.

Voting

References

External links 
Icelandic National Final 1994

1994
Countries in the Eurovision Song Contest 1994
Eurovision